Symphony No. 8 may refer to:
Symphony No. 8 (Arnold)
Symphony No. 8 (Beethoven)
Symphony No. 8 (Bruckner)
Symphony No. 8 (Davies), "Antarctic" Symphony
Symphony No. 8 (Diamond), by David Diamond, 1958–1960
Symphony No. 8 (Dvořák)
Symphony No. 8, Op. 105 (1965), a symphony by Jacobo Ficher
Symphony No. 8 (Glass)
Symphony No. 8 (Glazunov)
Symphony No. 8 (Haydn), "Le Soir"
Symphony No. 8 (Michael Haydn)
Symphony No. 8 (Henze)
Symphony No. 8 (Hovhaness), a symphony with a name
Symphony No. 8 (Kabeláč), "Antiphonies"
Symphony No. 8 (Mahler), "Symphony of a Thousand"
Symphony No. 8, Op. 186 (1936–37), a symphony by Erkki Melartin
Symphony No. 8, a symphony by Peter Mennin
Symphony No. 8 (Milhaud)
Symphony No. 8 (Mozart)
Symphony No. 8 (Myaskovsky)
Symphony No. 8 (Penderecki), "Lieder der Vergänglichkeit"
Symphony No. 8 (Pettersson), a symphony by Allan Pettersson
Symphony No. 8 (Piston)
Symphony No. 8 (Rautavaara), "The Journey"
Symphony No. 8 (Rubbra), a symphony with a name
Symphony No. 8 (Sallinen)
Symphony No. 8 (Schnittke), a symphony by Alfred Schnittke
Symphony No. 8 (Schubert), "Unfinished"
Symphony No. 8, a symphony by William Schuman
Symphony No. 8 (Sessions)
Symphony No. 8 (Shostakovich)
Symphony No. 8 (Sibelius)
Symphony No. 8 (Simpson)
Symphony No. 8 (Vaughan Williams)
Symphony No. 8 (Villa-Lobos)

008